Chientina is a village in Tuscany, central Italy,  administratively a frazione of the comune of Terricciola, province of Pisa.

Chientina is about 32 km from Pisa and 5 km from Terricciola.

References

Bibliography 
 

Frazioni of the Province of Pisa